Third Man Records is an eclectic, vinyl-focused independent record label founded and owned by Jack White, Ben Blackwell and Ben Swank. The company operates out of three locations—Nashville, Tennessee, Detroit, Michigan, and Soho, London—with multiple entities expanding upon the offerings of a traditional record label, including multiple live music venues, vinyl pressing plant, film studio and dark room, guitar pedal and gear company, mastering studio, vinyl subscription service, and publishing arm.

History
In 2001, while Jack White was gaining regional notice in the White Stripes in Detroit, he registered the label Third Man Records, proceeding to trademark the name in 2004. It wasn’t until 2008 when the White Stripes stopped touring and recording, and after White had reclaimed the rights to the band's earlier music, that White turned his focus to the label.

White recruited his nephew, White Stripes archivist and Dirtbombs drummer Ben Blackwell and his lifelong friend, Ben Swank, then the drummer for the Soledad Brothers and a promoter in London, to create a working business on March 11, 2009. White conceived the expansion idea in October 2008, phoning Swank and Blackwell to say the venture should first concentrate on releasing White Stripes' back catalog on vinyl. Blackwell moved from Detroit and Swank from London to establish the business. The Nashville location now serves as a record store, label and publishing offices, The Blue Room live venue and bar, photo studio/darkroom, master recordings vault, and fulfillment center. To commemorate the opening of Third Man Records in Nashville, White debuted his new project, the Dead Weather, performing a short set for the 150 invited guests and coining the label's motto, "Your Turntable's Not Dead."

The label's name incorporates several elements of personal significance to White. His fondness for the number three is well documented. It refers to Carol Reed's The Third Man starring Joseph Cotten and Orson Welles. White's pre-White Stripes upholstering company, which he continues to maintain as a hobby and artistic outlet in the present day, is named Third Man Upholstery and is similarly identified by the colors yellow and black and the motto “Your Upholstery’s Not Dead.”

Third Man has since reissued all six White Stripes studio releases on vinyl, and the label’s catalog has now grown to over 800 releases, including albums by White’s other acts, contributions from Billie Eilish, Neil Young, Sleep, Metallica, Margo Price, Coldplay, and Jay-Z, and many developing artists.

Nashville location
The label's headquarters is located in a less prosperous neighborhood, which is home to the city's largest homeless shelter, a transitional housing and recuperation center, and an affordable healthcare clinic. White's presence has raised the area's prominence, motivating the city and business owners to rezone the area with more commercial ventures, including multiple mixed-use developments, a Ritz Carlton Hotel, and a members' club. White opposes the idea, calling the environment "a solid neighborhood [where] everyone looks out for each other."  The location is organized around five dedicated sections: the record store, a "novelties lounge", the label's offices and distribution center, a live venue and bar (The Blue Room), and a darkroom/photo studio.

The Novelties Lounge, located within the record store, debuted on November 23, 2012. The space contains a collection of vintage novelty machines. "Among the attractions in the new wing is a Scopitone machine—a video jukebox using 16mm film that had its greatest prominence in the 1960s. Third Man has loaded their Scopitone with 36 videos from the label catalog, and bill it as 'the world's ONLY Scopitone machine fully loaded with modern music.' Other highlights include a "Wax-O-Matic machine", which makes bright red wax molds of White's Airline guitar, and a full-color photo booth." On April 20, 2013, in celebration of Jack White's role as Record Store Day Ambassador, The Third Man Recording Booth, "a refurbished 1947 Voice-o-Graph machine that can record up to two minutes audio and press it onto 6-inch phonograph discs" was introduced as an addition to the Novelties Lounge. This voice-o-graph was used in the creating of Apple's 2014 holiday ad as shown in the behind the scene video. In August 2017, Third Man celebrated the total solar eclipse happening event "Occulting the Sunn", in Nashville.

Detroit location
In 2015, White partnered with Shinola—a lifestyle brand most known as a watch manufacturer—to open a retail location in Detroit.  Third Man opened its first branch location at the former Willy's Overland Motorland Company in Detroit's Cass Corridor by Record Store Day's Black Friday event on November 27, 2015.

Third Man Pressing
In February 2017, the Third Man Pressing plant launched in Third Man Records' Detroit location, the first to open there since 1965. The plant began with eight Newbilt presses imported from Germany. In 2019 they expanded to add Third Man Mastering, which provides audio mastering services as well as vinyl lacquer cutting.

London location
In September 2021, Third Man Records opened a third retail location, live venue, and label office in London's Soho neighborhood. To celebrate the grand opening, White performed in the basement venue as well as from the balcony belonging to visual artist Damien Hirst, whose building sits at the end of the street.

Rolling Record Store
On March 9, 2011, Third Man Records announced its newest creation, the Third Man Rolling Record Store,  a yellow step van outfitted with a sound system and Third Man Records inventory. It was built by C Cook Enterprises in Erlanger, Kentucky. It made its first appearance in Austin, Texas, at SXSW 2011. Third Man has since brought the mobile store to concerts, festivals, and other events with anywhere from weeks to only a few hours’ notice.

Third Man Records Vault
The Third Man Records Vault is a "rarity-excavating" quarterly subscription service that began in September 2009 as a way to release special and otherwise unreleased content. Platinum members of the Vault receive a package containing limited-edition vinyl records and merchandise every three months. Generally each cycle's offerings have included a 12-inch record, a 7-inch record and a "bonus item" (this many include, a poster, book, pins, etc. ... ), although this format has been deviated from multiple times.

Discography
Third Man releases some music on compact disc and via electronic release on iTunes, but vinyl records are its primary format.

In addition to pressing titles on regular black vinyl, most releases have an exclusive and/or limited sister pressing on colored or multicolored vinyl. Beginning with TMR-003, a limited edition handmade batch of 100 tri-colored 7-inch vinyl, in equal parts black, yellow, and white, were produced for exclusive distribution at Third Man's Nashville location. Beginning with TMR-009, an additional 50 tri-colored vinyl have been pressed for random distribution in Third Man mail orders. Certain single releases have been sold on tri-colored vinyl available at record stores in the artist's hometown instead of at the Nashville store. An additional 50 are still randomly distributed in mail orders.

Recordings from live shows in the Blue Room (recorded either directly to analog reel-to-reel tape or direct-to-acetate) are made available in black and blue vinyl in varying quantities. These split-color records are available only to show attendees, and each LP is sealed with a concert-specific label on which the purchaser's name is written.

Third Man is known for pushing the boundaries with vinyl record production, and with the help of United Record Pressing (their main partner in manufacturing records prior to the opening of Third Man Pressing), their innovations include the following unique record pressings: Glow In The Dark Record, Triple-Decker Record (a 7-inch within a 12-inch), Texas-Sized Record (8" and 13" records), Metallized Record, Liquid-Filled Record, Scented Record, Rose Petal-Filled Record, Playable Etching Record, 3 RPM Record, Lightning Bolt Record, Bolt-A-Trope Record, and the Flex-Ray Record (a flexi disc made from an x-ray).

Two albums released by Third Man Records have received sales certification awards from the Recording Industry Association of America: White Blood Cells by the White Stripes was certified Platinum for sales of at least 1 million units and Blunderbuss by Jack White was certified Gold for sales of at least 500,000 units. Additionally, the DVD release of the White Stripes documentary film Under Great White Northern Lights was certified Gold for longform video sales of at least 50,000 units.

See also
 List of record labels

References

Footnotes

Bibliography
"Catalog." Third Man Records.

External links
 

 
Record labels established in 2001
American record labels
Vanity record labels
Jack White
Alternative rock record labels
Folk record labels
Country music record labels
Hip hop record labels
Culture of Detroit
Economy of Detroit
Culture of Nashville, Tennessee
Economy of Nashville, Tennessee
2001 establishments in Michigan